Infection Control & Hospital Epidemiology is a peer-reviewed medical journal published by Cambridge University Press. It publishes research on control and evaluation of the transmission of pathogens in healthcare institutions and on the use of epidemiological principles and methods to evaluate and improve the delivery of care, including infection control practices, surveillance, cost-benefit analyses, resource use, occupational health, and regulatory issues. The journal is published for the Society for Healthcare Epidemiology of America.

External links 
 
 Society for Healthcare Epidemiology of America

University of Chicago Press academic journals
Publications established in 1980
Microbiology journals
Monthly journals
Cambridge University Press academic journals